Aleksei Valeryevich Smetanin (born 19 March 1981) is a former Russian football player.

External links
 

1981 births
Living people
Russian footballers
PFC CSKA Moscow players
Russian Premier League players
FC Akhmat Grozny players

Association football forwards